Hello Sadness is the fourth studio album by British indie pop band Los Campesinos!. It was recorded during summer 2011 in a small studio near Figueres, Spain, and was produced by John Goodmanson. It is the band's first release to feature new drummer Jason (formerly of The Ghost Frequency) and the first full-length release to feature new members Rob and Kim, who had previously first appeared on the All's Well That Ends EP in 2010. The album is also the group's final release to feature violinist Harriet, who left before the album's release, and bassist Ellen who left the band in December 2012.

The album was released on 14 November 2011 in the United Kingdom and 15 November 2011 in the United States and Canada. In August 2012, the album shortlisted for the 2012 Welsh Music Prize.

Release
The album's pre-release bundle featured the CD, a digital download, a T-shirt, a DVD and an exclusive release called Hold on Now, Youngster...: The Demos, which featured demo tracks from the recording of the band's 2008 debut album Hold on Now, Youngster... as well as the non-album rarity "How I Taught Myself to Scream" and the previously unreleased track "No Tetris".

The general release of the album featured the CD and a DVD featuring a documentary about the making of the album.

Track listing

 "By Your Hand" – 4:07
 "Songs About Your Girlfriend" – 3:18
 "Hello Sadness" – 4:13
 "Life Is a Long Time" – 4:21
 "Every Defeat a Divorce (Three Lions)" – 5:04
 "Hate for the Island" – 2:20
 "The Black Bird, the Dark Slope" – 3:55
 "To Tundra" – 4:11
 "Baby I Got the Death Rattle" – 4:13
 "Light Leaves, Dark Sees Pt. II" – 4:20

Personnel
Adapted from Bandcamp.

Musicians
 Los Campesinos!
 Gareth Paisey – vocals, writing
 Kim Paisey – vocals, keyboards
 Robert Taylor – vocals, guitar, keyboards
 Ellen Waddell – bass, vocals
 Neil Turner – guitar
 Tom Bromley – guitar, brass arrangements, writing
 Jason Adelinia – drums, percussion
 Harriet Coleman – string arrangements, violin, piano
 Benjamin Kaminski – viola
 Jimmy Ottley – cello
 Samantha Boshnack – trumpet, flugelhorn
 Nelson Bell – trombone, tuba
Jherek Bischoff – double bass, brass arrangements
Tom Bischoff – brass arrangements  
Technical

 John Goodmanson – mixing, recording, producing 
 Jose Luis Molero – assistant engineering
 Eric Corson – assistant engineering
 Andrew Lewis – producer

References

2011 albums
Los Campesinos! albums
Arts & Crafts Productions albums
Wichita Recordings albums